Kosmos 19 ( meaning Cosmos 19), also known as DS-P1 No.3 was a prototype radar target satellite for anti-ballistic missile tests, which was launched by the Soviet Union in 1963 as part of the Dnepropetrovsk Sputnik programme. Its primary mission was to demonstrate the necessary technologies for radar tracking of spacecraft, which would allow future satellites to function as targets.

Spacecraft
Its primary mission was to demonstrate the necessary technologies for radar tracking of spacecraft, which would allow future satellites to function as targets. It was a solar-powered satellite manufactured by Yuzhnoye.

Mission
It was launched aboard a Kosmos-2I 63S1 rocket, from Mayak-2 at Kapustin Yar. The launch occurred at 06:00:00 GMT on 6 August 1963. It decayed from orbit on 30 March 1964.

Kosmos 19 was a prototype DS-P1 satellite, the third of four to be launched. It was preceded by the successful launch of Kosmos 6 on 30 June 1962, and a launch failure on 6 April 1963, and will be succeeded by Kosmos 25, which will be launched on 27 February 1964.

See also

 1963 in spaceflight

References

Spacecraft launched in 1963
Kosmos 0019
1963 in the Soviet Union
Spacecraft which reentered in 1964
Dnepropetrovsk Sputnik program